Loretta Nall is the founder of the United States Marijuana Party, which calls for the legalization of cannabis. She was a write-in candidate for governor of Alabama in 2006.

History 
Nall founded the USMjParty in 2002. In 2005, she co-founded Alabamians for Caring Use, a medical marijuana advocacy/lobbying group. Before his 2005 arrest in Vancouver, the so-called "Prince of Pot," Marc Emery, employed Nall under the auspices of Cannabis Culture magazine. Nall herself was booked and jailed for less than one day on September 17, 2002, for possession of marijuana and drug paraphernalia after police made a search of her home.

Besides advocating the legalization of cannabis in the United States, Nall is also an outspoken critic of the worldwide war on drugs. After a 2004 visit to Colombia, she has spoken and written against the United States and Colombian militaries' aerial destruction of Colombian coca fields with herbicides, citing dangers to local human populations and the environment.

Nall also calls for tax credits for homeschoolers, American withdrawal from the Iraq War, and an end to the war on drugs. She opposes the No Child Left Behind, USA PATRIOT, and REAL ID acts. Nall is a contributor to LewRockwell.com.

2006 Alabama gubernatorial campaign
Nall secured the Libertarian Party of Alabama's 2006 nomination for governor of Alabama at the party's 8 April 2006 convention in Montgomery, Alabama. Since Nall's campaign failed to collect the 40,000+ signatures required to achieve statewide ballot access in Alabama, she ran as a write-in candidate against Republican incumbent Bob Riley and Democratic challenger Lucy Baxley. Nall's campaign was covered by national media after pictures of the candidate that revealed her buxom appearance drew comments from local political commentator Bob Ingram. Ingram concluded a 7 March 2006 op-ed in the Montgomery Independent with the following comment:

The election was won by Riley, with Nall receiving only 235 votes, or 0.02%, but she says that she will continue to run for Alabama office in the future.

Sex toy drive
In November 2007, to protest the Anti-Obscenity Enforcement Act of 1998, Nall encouraged people to mail sex toys to Alabama Attorney General Troy King, who sought to prosecute shops that sell the devices.

Notes

External links
 U.S. Marijuana Party
 Alabamians for Caring Use
 Pot TV (Nall has been a reporter for this subsidiary of Cannabis Culture Magazine)
 MSNBC mention of Nall's gubernatorial campaign (YouTube video)
 Downloadable audio interview with Free Talk Live

Year of birth missing (living people)
Living people
Activists from Alabama
Alabama Libertarians
American anti–Iraq War activists
American cannabis activists
American political writers
American political party founders
Women in Alabama politics
American women non-fiction writers
21st-century American women politicians
21st-century American politicians